Egyptian Volleyball Federation is the governing body for volleyball in Egypt and is responsible for the administration of the Egyptian national volleyball teams (both men's and women's). Its offices are located in Nasr City, Cairo.

See also
Egypt men's national volleyball team
Egypt women's national volleyball team

References

External links 
 Official website

 

Volleyball in Egypt
Volleyball
National members of the African Volleyball Confederation
Organisations based in Cairo
Sports organizations established in 1992
1992 establishments in Egypt